The White Cliffs of Dover are cliffs which form part of the coastline of England, facing the Strait of Dover.

Cliffs of Dover may also refer to:
"Cliffs of Dover" (1984), an instrumental composition by American guitarist Eric Johnson;
IL-2 Sturmovik: Cliffs of Dover (2011), a combat flight simulation video game by Maddox Games, the developers of IL-2 Sturmovik (2001).

See also
White Cliffs of Dover (disambiguation)